The 2015 AFF U-19 Youth Championship was the 13th edition of the tournament which was held in Laos for the first time between 22 August to 4 September 2015. It was initially going to be played in Indonesia but they were suspended by FIFA in May 2015.

Teams
All twelve member associations of the ASEAN Football Federation were set to take part in the tournament featuring three groups of four teams, but with Indonesia's suspension, they were omitted and the AFF reverted to two groups featuring six and five teams.

The following groups were drawn at the 15th AFF Council meeting in Singapore on 16 June 2015.

Venue

Squads

Group stage
All matches were held in Laos.
All times were local, LST (UTC+7).

Group A

Group B

Knockout stage

Semi-finals

Third place match

Final

Winners

Goalscorers
6 goals

 Worachit Kanitsribampen

4 goals

 Suksan Mungpao
 Ritthidet Phensawat
 Hà Đức Chinh

3 goals

 Sinthanong Phanvongsa
 Mohd Jafri Firdaus Chew
 Jakkit Wachpirom
 Sansern Limwatthana
 Supachai Jaided
 Nguyễn Tiến Linh

2 goals

 Sath Rosib
 Piyaphong Pathammavong
 Mathew Custodio
 Mark Winhoffer
 Anon Amornlerdsak
 Wisarut Imura
 Hồ Minh Dĩ
 Phạm Trọng Hoá

1 goal

 Mohd Abdul Mateen
 Mohd Akif Roslan
 Chin Vannak
 Chreng Polroth
 Son Vandeth
 Touch Roma
 Sayfa Aphideth
 Somxay Keohanam
 Souksavanh Xayalin
 Phathana Phommathep
 Mohd Danial Ashraf
 Mohd Nazirul Afif
 Mohd Shahrul Akmal
 Thipanraj Subramaniam
 Syamer Kutty Abba
 Aung Zin Phyo
 Kaung Chit Naing
 Kyaw Ko Ko Oo
 Mohd Haiqal Anugrah
 Phattharaphon Jansuwan
 Ervino Soares
 Gelvanio Alberto
 José Oliveira
 Lâm Thuận
 Trần Duy Khánh
 Trương Tiến Anh

Own goals

 Mohd Rahimin Abdul Ghani (playing against Thailand)
 Mar Diano (playing against Laos)

References

External links

U-19
2015
AFF U-19 Youth Championship
2015
2015 in youth association football